Carlotta Mercedes Agnes McCambridge (March 16, 1916 – March 2, 2004) was an American actress of radio, stage, film, and television. Orson Welles called her "the world's greatest living radio actress."  She won an Academy Award for Best Supporting Actress for her screen debut in All the King's Men (1949) and was nominated in the same category for Giant (1956). She also provided the voice of the demon Pazuzu in The Exorcist (1973).

Early life
McCambridge was born in Joliet, Illinois, the daughter of Irish-American Catholic parents Marie (née Mahaffry) and John Patrick McCambridge, a farmer.<ref name="usa">{{cite news| url=https://www.usatoday.com/life/people/2004-03-17-mercedes-mccambridge_x.htm| title=The Exorcist actress Mercedes McCambridge dies at 85| work=USA Today| date=March 17, 2004| access-date=2013-10-24}}</ref> She graduated from Mundelein College in Chicago.

Career

Radio
McCambridge began her career as a radio actor during the 1930s while also performing on Broadway. In 1941, she played Judy's friend in A Date with Judy. She had the title role in Defense Attorney, a crime drama broadcast on ABC in 1951–52. Her other work on radio included:
 episodes of Lights Out (including "It Happened", 5/11/1938; "Execution", 4/27/1943 and "The Word", 9/14/1943)
 episodes of Inner Sanctum (including "Blood of Cain", 1/29/1946, "Death's Old Sweet Song", 11/4/1946, "But the Dead Walk Alone" (December 2, 1946). and "'Til Death Do Us Part", 10/27/1947)
 episodes of the Bulldog Drummond radio series
 episodes of Gang Busters episodes of Murder at Midnight (including "The Man with the Black Beard", 5/8/1950)
 episodes of Studio One (including "Anthony Adverse", 10/14/1947; "Kitty Foyle", 11/4/1947 and "The Thirty-Nine Steps", 3/28/1948)
 Episode of Alfred Hitchcock Presents as Dr. Constance Peterson in Spellbound
 episodes of Screen Directors Playhouse (including "Spellbound", 1/25/1951 and "Only Yesterday", 7/5/1951)
 episodes of Ford Theater (including "The Horn Blows at Midnight", 3/4/1949)
 Rosemary Levy on Abie's Irish Rose Peggy King Martinson on This Is Nora Drake (1948)
 various characters on the radio series I Love A Mystery in both its West Coast and East Coast incarnations (most notably as The Stewardess and Charity Martin in The Thing That Cries in the Night, Nasha and Laura in Bury Your Dead, Arizona, Sunny Richards in both The Million Dollar Curse and The Temple of Vampires and Jack "Jacqueline" Dempsey Ross in The Battle of the Century)

She frequently performed feature roles on the CBS Radio Mystery Theater, and was an original cast member on Guiding Light (before the Bauers took over as the central characters). She also starred in her own show, Defense Attorney on ABC 1951–52, as Martha Ellis Bryan.

From June 22, 1953, to March 5, 1954, McCambridge starred in the soap opera Family Skeleton on CBS.

Television
McCambridge played Katherine Wells in Wire Service, a drama series that aired on ABC during 1956–57, produced by Desilu Productions.
The series starred McCambridge, George Brent, and Dane Clark as reporters for the fictional Trans Globe Wire Service.

In the season one episode of the original Lost in Space series "The Space Croppers", first aired on CBS on March 30, 1966, McCambridge played Sybilla, the matriarch of a family of supernatural space farmers.

In an episode of Bewitched entitled "Darrin Gone! and Forgotten," which first aired on ABC on 17 October 1968, McCambridge played a powerful witch named Carlotta, a frenemy of Endora.  (Note that Carlotta was McCambridge's actual first name.)  Endora and Carlotta had made a pact "at the turn of the century" that their first-born children would one day marry.  When, according to the terms pact, certain celestial phenomena signaled it was time for the marriage, Carlotta (McCambridge) disappeared Darrin and pushed for Samantha to marry her coddled son Juke (played by veteran character actor Steve Franken).

Films
McCambridge's film career took off when she was cast as Sadie Burke opposite Broderick Crawford in All the King's Men (1949). McCambridge won the 1949 Academy Award for Best Supporting Actress for the role, while the film won Best Picture for that year. McCambridge also won the Golden Globe Awards for Best Supporting Actress and New Star of the Year – Actress for her performance.

In 1954, she co-starred with Joan Crawford and Sterling Hayden in the offbeat western drama, Johnny Guitar, now regarded as a cult classic. McCambridge and Hayden publicly declared their dislike of Crawford, with McCambridge labeling her "a mean, tipsy, powerful, rotten-egg lady."

McCambridge played the supporting role of Luz in the George Stevens classic Giant (1956), which starred Elizabeth Taylor, Rock Hudson, and James Dean. She was nominated for another Academy Award as Best Supporting Actress but lost to Dorothy Malone in Written on the Wind. In 1959, McCambridge appeared opposite Katharine Hepburn, Montgomery Clift and Elizabeth Taylor in the Joseph L. Mankiewicz film adaptation of Tennessee Williams' Suddenly, Last Summer.

McCambridge provided the dubbed voice of Pazuzu, the demon possessing the young girl Regan (played by Linda Blair) in The Exorcist. To sound as disturbing as possible, McCambridge insisted on swallowing raw eggs, chain smoking and drinking whiskey to make her voice harsh and her performance aggressive. Director William Friedkin also arranged for her to be bound to a chair during recordings, so that the demon seemed to be struggling against its restraints. Friedkin claimed that she initially requested no credit for the film—fearing it would take away from the attention of Blair's performance—but later complained about her absence of credit during the film's premiere. Her dispute with Friedkin and the Warner Bros. over her exclusion ended when, with the help of the Screen Actors Guild, she was properly credited for her vocal work in the film.

In the 1970s, she toured in a road company production of Cat on a Hot Tin Roof as Big Mama, opposite John Carradine as Big Daddy.

McCambridge appeared as a guest artist in college productions. In May 1977, she helped dedicate the theater building of  El Centro College by starring in a production of The Madwoman of Chaillot. Director Eddie Thomas had known her for many years and she conducted an actors' workshop for the college students during the week prior to the opening night. She returned in 1979 for El Centre's production of  The Mousetrap, in which she received top billing despite her character being murdered (by actor Jim Beaver) fewer than 15 minutes into the play. She also starred with longtime character actor Lyle Talbot (of ABC's The Adventures of Ozzie and Harriet) in the 1970 production of Come Back, Little Sheba in the University of North Alabama Summer Theatre Productions.

In the mid-1970s, McCambridge briefly took a position as director of Livengrin, a Pennsylvania rehabilitation center for alcoholics. She was at the same time putting the finishing touches on her soon-to-be released autobiography, The Quality of Mercy: An Autobiography (Times Books, 1981), .

Personal life
McCambridge married her first husband, William Fifield, in 1939. They had a son, John Lawrence Fifield, born in December, 1941. The couple divorced in 1946 after seven years of marriage.

In 1950 McCambridge married Canadian Fletcher Markle, an actor/producer/director who directed her in productions on Ford Theater and Studio One. Her son, John, later took Markle's name, thereafter being known as John Markle. During the marriage and afterward, McCambridge battled alcoholism, often being hospitalized after episodes of heavy drinking. She and Markle divorced in 1962, after twelve years of marriage. In 1969, after years with Alcoholics Anonymous, she achieved sobriety.

From 1975 to 1982, McCambridge devoted her time to the nonprofit Livengrin Foundation of Bensalem, Pennsylvania.  She first served as a volunteer member of the Board of Directors, then as president and CEO, responsible for the day-to-day operations of the treatment center, which at the time was a 76-bed residential program for both male and female alcoholics.  Livengrin still operates today, and has 129 beds and 8 outpatient clinics throughout southeastern Pennsylvania, treating both alcoholism and drug addiction.  McCambridge, through her celebrity and larger-than-life personality, helped bring public recognition to, and acceptance of the disease of addiction, as well as the benefits of seeking treatment for the disease.  She freely shared her own story of addiction and recovery as a means of reaching others in need of help.

She was a staunch outspoken liberal Democrat who campaigned for Adlai Stevenson.

McCambridge died on March 2, 2004, two weeks before her 88th birthday in La Jolla in San Diego, California, of natural causes.

Family tragedy
McCambridge's son John Markle, a UCLA graduate with a Ph.D. in Economics, joined the Little Rock, Arkansas investment firm Stephens Inc. in 1979, after working for Salomon Brothers in New York City. Markle was a successful futures trader, and quickly rose through the company's ranks. McCambridge gave Markle $604,000 to manage for her, but in the fall of 1987, the company discovered that Markle had opened a secret account in McCambridge's name. Soon the company found that Markle had been charging trading losses to the Stephens house account, while crediting profitable trades to McCambridge's account. Markle was later shown to have forged his mother's signature in opening the account.

Markle was placed on medical leave, then fired from his position at Stephens. McCambridge refused to cooperate with Markle and the company in instituting a repayment scheme that would have kept the matter from becoming public, saying that she had done nothing wrong and that Stephens Inc. owed her money. Shortly thereafter, in November 1987, Markle killed his family—his wife Christine (age 45) and daughters Amy (age 13) and Suzanne (age 9)—and then himself.  He left a note taking responsibility for his crimes and a long, bitter letter to his mother. The letter contained the following: "Initially you said, 'well, we can work it out' but NO, you refused… You called me a liar, a cheat, a criminal, a bum. You said I have ruined your life… You were never around much when I needed you, so now I and my whole family are dead—so you can have the money… 'Night, Mother."

Legacy
For her contributions to television and the motion picture industry, Mercedes McCambridge has two stars on the Hollywood Walk of Fame: one for motion pictures at 1722 Vine Street, and one for television at 6243 Hollywood Boulevard.

Filmography

 See also 

Notes

References

Further reading
 Lackmann, Ronald W. Mercedes Mccambridge: A Biography And Career Record. McFarland & Company. 2005. .
 McCambridge, Mercedes. The Quality of Mercy: An Autobiography. Times Books, 1981. .
 Terrace, Vincent. Radio Programs, 1924–1984''. Jefferson, North Carolina: McFarland, 1999. .

External links

 
 
 

1916 births
2004 deaths
20th-century American actresses
Actors from Joliet, Illinois
Actresses from Illinois
American film actresses
20th-century American memoirists
American people of Irish descent
American radio actresses
American stage actresses
American television actresses
Best Supporting Actress Academy Award winners
Best Supporting Actress Golden Globe (film) winners
New Star of the Year (Actress) Golden Globe winners
California Democrats
Illinois Democrats
Loyola University Chicago alumni
American women memoirists
21st-century American women